"Running" is the debut single by English singer Jessie Ware from her debut studio album, Devotion (2012). The song was released in the United Kingdom as a digital download on 24 February 2012. The drum loop used in the chorus of the song was based on Prince's "The Ballad of Dorothy Parker". The single features a particularly popular remix of the song by Disclosure, which was later featured as a bonus track in the deluxe edition of their debut studio album, Settle (2013). The remix was featured in the Xbox 360 and Xbox One racing game Forza Horizon 2 (2014).

Music video
A music video to accompany the release of "Running" was first released on YouTube on 13 February 2012 at a total length of four minutes and thirty-five seconds. The video was directed by Kate Moross.

Track listing

Chart performance

Release history

References

2012 singles
Jessie Ware songs
2011 songs
Island Records singles
Songs written by Jessie Ware